Manga (stylised as maNga) is a Turkish rock band whose music is mainly a fusion of Anatolian melodies with electronic elements. In 2009, they won both the Best Turkish Act award from MTV Turkey and consequently the Best European Act award from MTV Networks Europe in MTV Europe Music Awards 2009. They represented Turkey at the Eurovision Song Contest 2010 with the song "We Could Be the Same" and took second place.

History
maNga was formed in the year 2001. It was guitarist Yağmur Sarıgül's idea to name the band after Japanese comics. Initially, they were mostly underground, playing covers of other rock and metal bands. The band made the music for Aşık Veysel's poem Kara Toprak, and later used a different poem by Göksel for the song which came to be known as Dursun Zaman (by the title of Göksel's poem "Dursun Zaman"). They came into the public spotlight after becoming runner-up at the Sing your song music contest. This caught the attention of artist manager Hadi Elazzi (GRGDN), who immediately promoted the band to Sony Music, which resulted in their first, self-titled album being published in 2004, becoming a hit. Following this, they performed at various music festivals and have worked with various famous Turkish singers as Koray Candemir (of Kargo fame), Vega and Göksel. On 13 August 2006, maNga became the first Turkish rock band to take stage at the Sziget Festival, Budapest, Hungary. In 2006 they also had concerts in the Netherlands and Germany. Most of their songs are written by the group members. The genre of their music was described by Yağmur, the author of most of the songs, as blending nu metal and hip hop in a "pot" with melodies of Anatolia. maNga's duet with Göksel is included in one of the most successful (with almost a million viewers) Turkish films, Sınav (featuring Jean-Claude Van Damme). Their song Bir kadın çizeceksin was featured among the music of the FIFA 06 game. The band headlined several Turkish music festivals, including Saklıfest, Patlıcan, Rokofest and Rock'n Coke. The band was to take stage in the Wembley Stadium in London, together with Tarkan, but maNga did not perform due to technical difficulties on 13 April 2008. They also played in London's O2 Academy Islington on 4 December 2009. On 12 January 2010 the Turkish broadcaster TRT announced that maNga would be the Turkish representative at the Eurovision Song Contest 2010. They came second with 170 points, behind Germany.

Members

Current members
 Ferman Akgül - vocals (2001–present), keyboards (2013-present)
 Yağmur Sarıgül - guitar (2001–present)
 Cem Bahtiyar - bass guitar (2001–present)
 Özgür Can Öney - drums (2001–present)

Former members
 Orçun Şekerusta - bass guitar (2001)
 Efe Yılmaz - DJ, electronics (2001–2013)

Guest musicians and upcoming members 

 Turgut Özüfler - Qanun (2021) (Antroposen 001)
 Jarrod Cagwin - Percussion(2021) (Antroposen 001)
 İlker Aksungar - DJ(2021) (Antroposen 001)

*official membership of the Guest Musicians is to be announced at the release of maNga's next album*

Discography

Albums

Extended plays

Singles

Other appearances

Awards and nominations

Participations in festivals 
Important festivals maNga has participated so far:

 7. METU Rock Festival, 2002, Turkey
 European Youth Festival, 2002, Turkey
 Tuborg Rock Festival, 2004, Turkey
 Rockistanbul festival, 2004, Turkey
 Eregli Festival 2005, Turkey
 Rock'n Coke 2005, Turkey
 Rock 'N Live, 2005 Turkey
 Mimar Sinan University, 2005, Turkey
 Saklifest Ankara 2006, Turkey
 Ankirockfest 2006, Turkey
 BİMFEST! 2006, Turkey
 Sziget, 2006, Hungary
 Eggplant, 2007, Turkey
 Rock 'n Coke, 2009 Turkey
 ITU Spring Festival of 2009, Turkey
 Cukurova University Fest., 2009, Turkey
 Gazi University Fest., 2009, Turkey
 Rock the Balkans 2009, Bulgaria
 Rock'n Coke 2009, Turkey
 Emerging talents in 2010 Bilkent University, Turkey
 Uludag University Spring Festival of 2010, Turkey
 AİBÜ, 2010 Spring Festival, Turkey
 Eurovision Song Contest 2010, Norway
 Fanta Youth Festival 2011, Turkey
 Spring Festival 2011 Marmara University, Istanbul / Turkey
 Fatih Dershaneleri Spring Festival in 2012, Turkey
 TED Ankara College of Traditional Dry Bean Day 2012, Turkey
 Istanbul Aydin University Spring Festival of 2012, Turkey
 METU College 2012-2013 Academic Year Opening Concert, September 30, 2012, Turkey
 Gordion Youth Festival Interview Signing Day and December 8, 2012, Ankara / Turkey
 Fest'13 Gediz Gediz University, Izmir / Turkey
 Rock'n Coke 2013, Istanbul / Turkey
 Altug, Mehmet Niyazi Anatolian High School, MNAFEST May 12, 2014 in Istanbul / Turkey
 The Vefa High School, vefafest'14, June 6, 2014, in Istanbul / Turkey
 Çankaya Municipality Anıtpark, April 19, 2015, Ankara / Turkey
 Olive Rock Festival, August 29, 2018, Balıkesir / Turkey
 milyonfest Istanbul, September 14, 2018, in Istanbul / Turkey
 Young Bi Festival, May 4, 2019, in Istanbul / Turkey
 METU Northern Cyprus Campus 12th Spring Festival, 12 May 2019, Turkish Republic of Northern Cyprus.

See also
Turkish rock
Rock'n Coke
Manga

References

Sources
MangaClub>> maNga >> Biography
maNga Official site
https://tr.wikipedia.org/
 :tr:MaNga

External links

 maNga official website 

2001 establishments in Turkey
Alternative metal musical groups
Eurovision Song Contest entrants of 2010
Musical groups established in 2001
Musical groups from Ankara
Nu metal musical groups
Turkish alternative rock groups
Eurovision Song Contest entrants for Turkey
Turkish heavy metal musical groups
MTV Europe Music Award winners